The Maritime and Port Bureau (MPB) is the port authority under the Ministry of Transportation and Communications of the Republic of China (Taiwan) responsible for building a quality environment for the maritime industry, reinforce maritime capabilities for higher competitiveness, implement national maritime policies, maintain order and safety at sea and cultivate maritime human resources in Taiwan.

History
The bureau was established on 1 March 2012.

Organizational structures
 Planning Division
 Maritime Affairs Division
 Vessel Management Division
 Port Affairs Division
 Crew Management Division
 Maritime Safety Division
 Secretariat
 Personnel Office
 Civil Service Ethics Office
 Comptroller Office
 Information Management Office
 Maritime Affairs Center
 Lighthouses

Transportation
The building is accessible within walking distance east from Technology Building Station of the Taipei Metro.

See also
 Executive Yuan
 Transportation in Taiwan

References

External links

 

2012 establishments in Taiwan
Executive Yuan
Port authorities